Rein Põldme (born 12 January 1937) is an Estonian rower, swimming coach and sport pedagogue.

He was born in Rakvere. In 1958 he graduated from Tartu University's Institute of Physical Education.

He started his swimming exercising in 1951, and rowing in 1954, coached by Ülo Tölp. 1956–1957 he became 2-times Estonian champion in rowing.

1958-1964 he worked in Tartu as a sport theoretician. Later he was a physical education pedagogue in several schools in Tartu, including in disability schools.

Since 1965 he is coaching para swimmers. Students: Nadežda Maksimova, Tiiu Mallene-Sarv, Vilma Nugis, Marge Kõrkjas, Annika Raide, Paul Sepping, Ado Arukask, Mart Soomre, Virgo Kais.

Awards:
 1988: Merited Coach of Estonian SSR
 2014: Order of the White Star, V class
 2020:

References

Living people
1937 births
Estonian male rowers
Estonian swimming coaches
University of Tartu alumni
Estonian sportspeople
Recipients of the Order of the White Star, 5th Class
Sportspeople from Rakvere